Luke Bambridge and Jonny O'Mara were the defending champions but only O'Mara chose to defend his title, partnering Ken Skupski. O'Mara lost in the semifinals to Hans Podlipnik Castillo and Tristan-Samuel Weissborn.

Romain Arneodo and Hugo Nys won the title after defeating Podlipnik Castillo and Weissborn 6–7(5–7), 6–3, [10–1] in the final.

Seeds

Draw

References

External links
 Main Draw

Doubles